Arthoniomycetes are a class of ascomycete fungi. It includes two orders: Arthoniales and Lichenostigmatales. Most of the taxa in these orders are tropical and subtropical lichens.

Systematics
Phylogenetic analysis supports the monophyly of this class. Dothideomycetes is a sister group.

Characteristics
Taxa have apothecia, cup- or saucer- shaped ascoma in which the hymenium is exposed at maturity. These apothecia are bitunicate - with clearly differentiated inner and outer walls.

References

 
Fungus classes
Lichen classes
Taxa described in 1997